Bello (c. 755 – 810) was  Count of Carcassonne from 790 until his death. He was the founder of the Bellonid Dynasty of Carcassonne and Razès which reached its apex in Wilfred the Hairy, progenitor of the House of Barcelona.

It is not known who Bello married, but several children have been suggested for him:
 Guisclafred, his successor in Carcassonne
 Oliba I, Count of Carcassonne and Razès
 Sunyer I, Count of Empúries
 Sunifred I, Count of Barcelona - may have been his son or possibly son-in-law.  He is mentioned to be the brother of Sunyer I; might have been his brother-in-law.
 Argila of Razès, Count of Carcassonne and Razès
 Bera of Barcelona, Count of Carcassonne and Razès, Count of Barcelona, Girona, Ausona, Empúries

Argila and Bera are less likely to have been sons of Bello.  Bera is also noted to be the son of William of Gellone, but that is also unlikely based on references detailing William's inheritance.

References

750s births
810 deaths
8th-century Visigothic people
9th-century Visigothic people
Counts of Carcassonne
Year of birth uncertain
Nobility of the Carolingian Empire